Diaphus vanhoeffeni, also known as VanHoffen's lanternfish, is a species of lanternfish found in the Eastern Atlantic Ocean.

Size

Etymology
The fish is named  in honor of German zoologist Ernst Vanhöffen (1858–1918), who was noted for his studies of medusa jellies aboard the research vessel Valdivia, the first German expedition to explore the deep sea, during which the type specimen was collected.

References

Myctophidae
Fish of the Atlantic Ocean
Taxa named by August Brauer
Fish described in 1906